Hajibey Farajulla oglu Sultanov (20 September 1921 – 5 March 2008) was an Azerbaijani astronomer and former head of the Shamakhy Astrophysical Observatory. Sultanov's main works tackle celestial mechanics and the genesis of the Solar System, as well as the origin, structure and evolution of the asteroid belt and minor planets. Sultanov was a member of the International Astronomical Union and European Astronomical Society.

Early life
Sultanov graduated from the faculty of physics and mathematics at the Baku State University in 1942, and fought on the Eastern Front of World War II. For his military service Sultanov was awarded the Order of the Patriotic War, and medals For Courage, For the Defence of the Caucasus, For the Liberation of Prague and For the Victory over Germany in the Great Patriotic War 1941–1945.

Academia
Having demobilized from the military in 1946, Sultanov began his scientific work in the Baku State University and completed postgraduate studies. Sultanov initially worked in the Institute of Physics and Mathematics of the Academy of Sciences of the Azerbaijan SSR. From 1953 Sultanov managed the planning and construction of the telescope at the Shamakhi Astrophysical Observatory. In 1953, he became the head of the newly established Astrophysics Department at that academy. In 1976–81, Sultanov was the Vice-President of the Academy of Sciences of the Azerbaijan SSR. Sultanov was also the head of the Shamakhi Astrophysical Observatory. Sultanov developed the hypothesis that a ring of minor planets formed as a result of successive disintegrations of few larger primary bodies that emerged at the beginning of the evolution of protoplanetary material. In 2004, Sultanov was awarded Shohrat Order for the advancement of Azerbaijani science.

Sultanov died during a fire in the administrative building of the Shamakhi Observatory in Baku on March 5, 2008.

References

1921 births
2008 deaths
Accidental deaths in Azerbaijan
Azerbaijani astronomers
Deaths from fire
Baku State University alumni
Soviet military personnel of World War II from Azerbaijan
Recipients of the Medal "For Courage" (Russia)
Recipients of the Shohrat Order
Soviet astronomers